Thurston Edward Daniels (October 10, 1859 – December 8, 1926) was a Populist politician from the U.S. state of Washington. He served as the third Lieutenant Governor of Washington.

References

Lieutenant Governors of Washington (state)
1859 births
1926 deaths
Washington (state) Populists
People's Party (United States) elected officials
People from Yamhill, Oregon